Patricia Helen Mary Jessel (15 October 1920 – 8 June 1968) was an English actress of stage, film and television.

Biography
Jessel was born in the then British Crown Colony of Hong Kong, daughter of Clement Edward Jessel and Ursula Theodora (née Buckley). She was the grandniece of Lillah McCarthy. She died from a heart attack in London in June 1968, aged 47.

Jessel appeared both in the West End and on Broadway in the 1950s in Agatha Christie's play Witness for the Prosecution, for which she won a Tony Award in 1955. As Romaine Heilger aka Romaine Vole, Jessel's performance in the dock was praised as "cold-blooded" and that she "makes a clear-cut image of hatred releasing itself suddenly from inhibitions which have become intolerable".

Other stage roles included Lady Macbeth at the Old Vic in 1962 and Lady Bracknell in The Importance of Being Earnest in the opening season of the Yvonne Arnaud Theatre in Guildford.

Selected filmography
 The Flesh Is Weak (1957)
 The Man Upstairs (1958)
 Armchair Theatre: Underground (TV, 1958)
 Model for Murder (1959)
 No Kidding (1960)
 The City of the Dead (a.k.a. Horror Hotel, 1960)
 A Jolly Bad Fellow (1964)
 A Funny Thing Happened on the Way to the Forum (1966)
 The Prisoner ("Checkmate", 1967)

References

External links
 
 

1920 births
1968 deaths
English film actresses
English stage actresses
English television actresses
British expatriates in Hong Kong
Tony Award winners
20th-century English actresses